The Château du Champ-de-Bataille, is a château located in the Eure department of the French region of Upper Normandy. It's a Baroque castle lying between the communes of Neubourg and Sainte-Opportune-du-Bosc, and in the Campagne du Neubourg, between the river Risle to the west and the river Iton to the east. It was built in the 17th century for the Maréchal de Créqui.

History 
In 1650 Alexandre de Créquy-Bernieulle (1628–1703) was arrested and exiled to the province by Cardinal Mazarin. He built the Château du Champ-de-Bataille between 1653 and 1665. After the Arrest the Château was the home of the family "de Merendonque". During the French Revolution, the Château was stormed  and the furniture was sold throughout France.

The Gardens 
The French formal garden was created from 1992 by a new owner, interior designer Jacques Garcia. It was inspired by sketches of the original garden, long vanished, which showed the placement of the great terrace, the broderies and bosquets, and the proportions of the squares of Apollo and Diana. These features were scrupulously reproduced, while the new features of the garden took their "measure and tone" from the original model. The garden is listed by the French Ministry of Culture as one of the Notable Gardens of France.

References

External links 
 Château du Champ de Bataille (French)
 Château du Champ de Bataille at the Committee of Parks and Gardens of the French Ministry of Culture
 Château du Champ-de-Bataille blog article in French with many photos, including aerial views of the grounds

Châteaux in Eure
Gardens in Eure
Museums in Eure
Historic house museums in Normandy